The 2009 Mediterranean wildfires were a series of wildfires that broke out across France, Greece, Italy, Spain, and Turkey in July 2009. Strong winds spread the fire during a hot, dry period of weather killing at least eight people, six of whom were in Spain. Some of the wildfires were caused by lightning, along with arson and military training.

Effects 
Four Spanish firefighters died in Catalonia on 21 July, and a fifth member died later from injuries on 23 July, as well as a fire engine driver in Teruel. A further two people died from bush fires in Sardinia. More than 120 people were rescued at Capo Pecora on Sardinia by helicopter and civil protection boats. The Arenas prison complex was evacuated and the inmates were temporarily transferred to the beach.

Around 2,000 people were evacuated from hills around the town of Collado Mediano, near Madrid. Aircraft with water and firefighters controlled the fire.

Estimates suggest that 5,000 hectares of forest and bush were affected in the Sierra Cabrera mountain range between Turre and Mojácar in Spain on 14–15 July. 500 people were evacuated, as dozens of firefighters and soldiers controlled the fires, including the use of five helicopters and three aircraft. On 23 July, the fires on the Sierra Cabrera on which Mojácar sits flared again, causing damage to the village and other houses in the area and the evacuation of around 1,500 residents.

Outside the French city of Marseille, 1,300 hectares (3211 acres) were destroyed. In Corsica, wildfires led to the destruction of approximately 4,000 hectares (10,000 acres) of bush and forest resulting in the injuries of five firemen.

More than 320 wildfires affected patches of forest across Greece, although they did affect buildings. Most of them were located on the island of Euboea and the southern Peloponnese.

On 23 July, over 15 hectares of land were destroyed in a landfill site in Bodrum, southwestern Turkey.

Causes 

In the Mediterranean region, the current fire frequency due to human activity is considered much larger than the natural rate. 95% of forest fires in Spain are human-induced. The 2009 Mediterranean wildfires occurred during a particularly hot and dry summer period, increasing the risk of wildfires burning out of control once ignited. These conditions, combined with insufficient fire-fighting resources and an inadequate official response in some of the affected countries, exacerbated the extent of the damage.

Uncontrolled legal and illegal scrub burning by farmers is a major cause of forest fires in the Mediterranean region. Arson, while still a significant factor, has diminished in Spain and Greece in recent years. Decreasing property values generally and the introduction of legislation in Spain to tackle the issue has diminished the financial incentive to illegally clear forested land for development by burning. Isolated cases of areas in Spain affected by fires caused by lightning strikes include Aragon (Spain), as reported by El Pais and Mojácar, as suggested by the Spanish Forest Fire Organisation (INFOCA). The wildfires outside of Marseille, France, were reported as being caused by military training using tracer bullets. The local government of Corsica believed the fires were caused by arson.

References

See also 
2009 Greek forest fires

Wildfires caused by arson
Arson in Europe
Mass murder in 2009
Mediterranean Wildfires, 2009
July 2009 crimes
July 2009 events in Europe
2009 in France
Wildfires in France
2009 in Greece
2009 in Italy
Wildfires in Italy
2009 in Spain
Wildfires in Spain
2009 in Turkey
Wildfires in Turkey
Mediterranean
2009 disasters in Europe